César Ritz Colleges Switzerland is a hospitality school with campuses in Le Bouveret and Brig, Switzerland. It is named after Swiss hôtelier and hospitality leader César Ritz—founder of the Hôtel Ritz in Paris and the Ritz and Carlton Hotels in London.

As of 2022, it is ranked sixth in the world among hospitality and leisure schools, according to the QS World University Rankings. The school offers bachelor's and master's degree programs in partnership with Washington State University (USA) and the University of Derby (UK), and shares its campuses with sister school Culinary Arts Academy Switzerland.

César Ritz Colleges Switzerland is owned by Swiss Education Group (SEG), which is an investment of the Hong Kong-based investment management company, Summer Capital. Summer Capital acquired Swiss Education Group in 2018.

History

In 1982, Dr. Wolfgang D. Petri opened the first college – Schulhotel Alpina – in Brig as part of the Hotelconsult Management Company. The following year, the second institute – Schulhotel Zillwald – opened in Lax, Valais. In 1985, the school launched Switzerland’s first Bachelor’s of Arts program in Hotel Management in partnership with Washington State University (USA).

The school’s namesake, César Ritz, is a well-known hôtelier and pioneer of the luxury hotel, Hotel Ritz Paris. In 1986, his daughter-in-law, Monique Ritz, together with The César Ritz Foundation, issued the school the right to rename the institution in his honor. As a result, the Institut Hôtelier César Ritz opened in Le Bouveret, and the Brig campus was later renamed University Centre César Ritz in 1997.

Throughout the 1990s and 2000s, the school forged academic partnerships with institutions in the United States, Australia, United Kingdom, Columbia, New Zealand, India, United Arab Emirates, Iceland, and Peru.

In 2005, Martin Kisseleff and Bernhard Schwestermann acquired the school and Dr. W. D. Petri – the former owner – became Honorary President. Later in 2011, César Ritz Colleges Group was acquired by Invision Private Equity AG and joined the hospitality education network Swiss Education Group.

What is now called Culinary Arts Academy Switzerland started in Luzern in 1998, became part of César Ritz Colleges Switzerland in 2011, also moving its campus to the former Hotel Union building in Lucerne. In 2013, the school began its partnership with the University of Derby (UK) for its master’s degree program.

César Ritz Colleges Switzerland – along with the rest of the hospitality education institutions under Swiss Education Group – was sold to the Hong Kong-based investment management company Summer Capital in 2018.

Milestones 

1982 Creation of "Hotelconsult Management Company" and opening of the first college, the "Schulhotel Alpina" in Brig, State of Valais, by Dr Wolfgang D. Petri.
1983 Opening of the second institute, the "Schulhotel Zillwald" in the health resort of Lax, in Valais.
1985 Transfer agreements are signed with several state universities in the United States, Europe and Australia.
1985 The first Bachelor program in hotel management in Switzerland is launched in co-operation with Washington State University (WSU), Pullman, WA, USA (2 years César Ritz + 2 years WSU).
1986 The César Ritz Foundation in the Valais Region and Mrs Monique Ritz, daughter-in-law of the famous hotelier, allows the school to name its colleges after César Ritz.
1986 Opening of the Institut Hôtelier "César Ritz" in Le Bouveret.
1991 Launch of the first hotel management postgraduate diploma program in Switzerland.
1992 First US Bachelor's degree in hotel management in Switzerland in collaboration with the University of Massachusetts Amherst.
1992 Creation of the ICHA Foundation and opening of the International College of Hospitality Administration in Brig.
1992 Opening of the International College of Hospitality Management César Ritz in Washington, Connecticut, USA.
1996 The International College of Management in Sydney (ICMS), Australia (formerly ICTHM - International College of Tourism & Hotel Management), opened with the César Ritz program.
1997 US Bachelor's degree delivered in partnership with Washington State University.
1997 Swiss Government authorities approve use of the name "University" for ICHA. The Brig campus is renamed University Centre César Ritz.
2000 The first Master of Science in International Hospitality Management is launched in Switzerland at University Centre César Ritz, in co-operation with Manchester Metropolitan University, UK.
2002 César Ritz Colleges Switzerland enrolls its 10,000th student.
2003 Recognition by the Canton of Valais, Switzerland for the Bachelor of International Business Degree and the Master of Business Administration in Hotel and Tourism Management offered at University Centre César Ritz. Opening of the International College of Hospitality Management César Ritz, the first and only Swiss hotel school in the US, located in Suffield, Connecticut.
2005 The first Swiss hotel management school receives accreditation from EduQua, the accrediting body of the World Tourism Organization. Mr. Martin Kisseleff, President, and Mr. Bernhard Schwestermann, CPA, arrange a management buy-out. Dr. W. D. Petri, the former owner is offered the title of Honorary President.
2006 The first "Double degree" agreement is signed with the University La Sabana, Bogota, Colombia. The Leadership Program is introduced at the undergraduate level.
2007 Partner school agreements are established in New Zealand, India, United Arab Emirates, Iceland, and Peru.
2008 Opening of the 225 single room "Themis & Xenius" student accommodation in Brig.
2010 The annual European conference of the prestigious United Nations World Tourism Organization is held at the University Centre César Ritz in Brig.
2011 Invision Private Equity AG acquires César Ritz Colleges Group. César Ritz Colleges joins the network of Swiss Education Group.
2012 DCT becomes part of César Ritz Colleges and moves to Lucerne. Opening of the Lucerne Campus in the former renovated Hotel Union building. César Ritz Colleges introduce iPads as an interactive learning tool provided to all students.
2013 César Ritz Colleges announces the University of Derby (UK) as its academic partner for all master's degree programs.
2021 César Ritz Colleges Switzerland (Le Bouveret campus) becomes Green Globe certified

Education
At César Ritz Colleges Switzerland, students can pursue a three-year Bachelor of Arts in International Business in Hotel & Tourism Management and a one-year Master of Arts in International Business in Entrepreneurship. Degree programs are warded in partnership with the University of Washington (USA) and University of Derby (UK) respectively.

Some of César Ritz Colleges Switzerland’s industry partners include Ritz Paris, Evian Resort, Comité Champagne and Switzerland Tourism.

The school’s curriculum blends principles of American entrepreneurship with the ethos of Swiss hospitality. Experiential learning is a core component of each program and students “learn by doing” by participating in hands-on activities alongside lectures.

The student body is made up of more than 60 nationalities and classes are taught in English. Students gain work experience during their studies through internships with industry partners.

Campuses
Students study across two campuses, shared with Culinary Arts Academy Switzerland in Le Bouveret and Brig, Switzerland.

Le Bouveret campus 

The campus in Le Bouveret is housed in a former hotel from the 1900s located on the shores of Lake Geneva near the French border. It is also home to the Apicius Culinary Training Center and the Mosimann Collection – a collection of culinary memorabilia provided by Swiss Chef Anton Mosimann OBE.

Brig campus 

The Brig campus is located in Brig-Glis – the largest German speaking town in the Valais region. It is split between two buildings in the center of town.

References

Hospitality schools in Switzerland
Brig-Glis
Business schools in Switzerland